Kowloon City is an area in New Kowloon, Hong Kong. It is part of Kowloon City District.

Compared with the council area of Kowloon City District, the Kowloon City area is

History 

As early as in the Qin dynasty (221 BCE – 206 BCE), Kowloon City was famous for its pearl production. During the Song dynasty (960–1279), Kowloon City was a part of Kwun Fu Cheung, which was a part of salt yard governed by Chinese officials. During the late Song Dynasty, two young emperors Zhao Bing and Duanzong sought refuge at current day Kowloon City, roughly at present day Sung Wong Toi Garden to escape from the growing Mongol Army. There are also historic relics and a temple which dates back to 800 years ago.

Part of the area was the location of the original Kowloon Walled City, erected during the Qing dynasty. This is now Kowloon Walled City Park. 

In 1982, Hong Kong was divided into 18 districts, and Kowloon City and its neighbouring areas, such as Hung Hom, have been part of the Kowloon City District since then.

Prior to 1998, a strict building height restriction was imposed in Kowloon City and over much of Kowloon to minimise the hazards of air traffic commuting through the Kai Tak Airport.

In more recent years, rapid gentrification has taken place and new residential skyscrapers have replaced old tong laus.

Nearby Sights 
 The passenger terminal of Kai Tak Airport, a defunct airport
 Kai Tak Sports Park
 Kowloon City Plaza
 Kowloon City's public market – one of the largest wet markets in Hong Kong
 Kowloon Walled City
 Holy Trinity Cathedral, the oldest church in Kowloon
 Sung Wong Toi Garden
Hau Wong temple

Features
Kowloon City is an old district in Hong Kong; however, it has been transforming into a modern district with a lot of new shops and restaurants over the years. The district is well known for its wide range of cuisine. Other than the traditional Hong Kong-style restaurants that offer local dishes, there are numerous restaurants that offer Southeast Asian dishes like Thai, Vietnamese and Indonesian.

Many Thai grocery stores can be found throughout this place, too. Due to the prevalence of Thai restaurants and stores as well as the population of Thai-speaking ethnic Chinese, Kowloon City is also known as "Hong Kong's Little Thailand". It is not only a food paradise for authentic main dishes of many cultures, but also a popular place for both traditional Hong Kong-style and western desserts. With a sizeable population from the Chiushan area of Guangdong Province, Kowloon City is also famous for Chiuchow-style braised dishes.

Transport 
Major roads that serves the area include:

 Boundary Street
Argyle Street
 Prince Edward Road

Kowloon City is served by Sung Wong Toi station of the Tuen Ma line.

Demographics
In 2016, about 33% of the Thai people living in Hong Kong resided in Kowloon City. Accordingly there is a concentration of Thai businesses there. Proposed redevelopment in 2022 threatened the Thai businesses.

Education
Pooi To Primary School is in Kowloon City.

Kowloon City is in Primary One Admission (POA) School Net 41. Within the school net are multiple aided schools (operated independently but funded with government money) and Kowloon Tong Government Primary School.

See also 
 List of places in Hong Kong

Footnotes

References

Further reading 
 < A history of Kowloon City >

 
New Kowloon
Thai Towns